H-E-B Grocery Company, LP, is an American privately held supermarket chain based in San Antonio, Texas, with more than 340 stores throughout the U.S. state of Texas, and in northeast Mexico. The company also operates Central Market, an upscale organic and fine foods retailer. As of 2022, the company has a total revenue of 38.9 billion. H-E-B ranked number 6 on Forbes 2022 list of "America's Largest Private Companies". H-E-B was named Retailer of the Year in 2010 by Progressive Grocer. Supermarket News ranks H-E-B 13th on the list of "Top 75 North American Food Retailers" by sales. Based on 2019 revenues, H-E-B is the 19th-largest retailer in the United States. It donates 5% of pretax profits to charity. The official mascot of H-E-B is named H-E-Buddy, an anthropomorphic brown grocery bag, with multiple grocery items emerging from the top.

History
The company was founded on November 26, 1905, when Florence Butt opened the C.C. Butt Grocery Store on the ground floor of her family home in Kerrville, Texas. In 1919, Howard Edward Butt, Florence's youngest son, took over the store upon his return from World War I. Shortly after becoming owner of his mother's small store, Howard tried four expansions into Central Texas, including one in Junction, all of which failed. Finally, in 1927, Howard launched a successful second store in Del Rio, Texas, followed by the purchase of three grocery stores in the Lower Rio Grande Valley. The initials of Howard E. Butt became the name of the store.

Charles, the younger son of Howard E. Butt, became president of H-E-B in 1971. As of 2019, Charles Butt is chairman and CEO of H-E-B, having grown the business from annual sales of $250 million in 1971 to $13 billion in 2006. In 2010, Craig Boyan was named H-E-B's president and COO. By 2018, Martin Otto, the former CFO and chief merchant, had become the COO. In 2011, the company was #12 H-E-B is the largest privately held company and largest private employer in Texas.

H-E-B acquired Favor Delivery as a wholly owned subsidiary in February 2018. The details of the merger were not disclosed.

In 2019, H-E-B invested millions of dollars to replace cashier stations with self-checkout kiosks or smartphone apps, at the same time that many other supermarkets (such as Walmart, Target, etc.) were shifting towards more self-checkout lanes and app usage.

Operations
Headquartered in downtown San Antonio, H-E-B operates more than 300 stores in over 150 communities across Texas. As of late 2010, its operations serve approximately "55-plus" percent of the Texas market, with primary Texas markets including the Corpus Christi, San Antonio, Austin, Laredo and Houston metro areas. The company does business in five different retail formats: general H-E-B stores, Central Market, H-E-B Plus, Mi Tienda and Joe V's Smart Shop. In 2010, the company announced plans to build 19 new stores in Texas. H-E-B opened its first store outside of Texas in 1996, a  H-E-B Pantry store in Lake Charles, Louisiana; though the expansion was short-lived and ultimately failed. The H-E-B Pantry store format was discontinued in 2000, and the company closed its sole Louisiana store in 2003. In 2010, H-E-B offered consumers the opportunity to vote on possible designs for new stores as they expand into new communities.

The company operates several manufacturing facilities in Texas, including one of the largest milk- and bread-processing plants in the Southwest. H-E-B produces many of their own-brand products, including milk, ice cream, bread, snacks, and ready-cooked meats and meals. These and other private-label products are sold under various brands, including "Central Market Naturals", "Central Market Organics", "H-E-B", "H-E-Buddy", "Hill Country Fare", "H-E-B Creamy Creations" ice cream, "H-E-B Mootopia" milk, and "H-E-B Fully Cooked".

Several stores include multiple-tenant operations through third-party lease arrangements. Many stores include a bank operation, cellular kiosk, and multiple nationally-recognized tenants.

The Austin Business Journal rated H-E-B as the largest private-sector employer in the region in 2017.

In 2019, the company announced plans to build a technology center at its headquarters complex.

Central Market

In 1994, H-E-B introduced its Central Market concept in Austin. Based in San Antonio, Central Market offers an organic and international food selection, including a European-style bakery and extensive wine and beer selections. The chain is now composed of 10 stores – three in Dallas, two in Austin, and one each in Fort Worth, Houston, Plano, San Antonio, and Southlake. H-E-B operates four different formats of stores that introduce general merchandise and elements of the Central Market concept: The Woodlands Market in The Woodlands in Montgomery County, Kingwood Market in the Kingwood section of Houston, and the Austin-Escarpment store in south Austin.  A fourth store opened on March 22, 2008, in West Lake Hills, and in 2009, the H-E-B in Bee Caves was remodeled.  H-E-B's Alon Market opened on October 17, 2008, in San Antonio.

In July 2015, the Market concept was expanded as a new Spring Creek Market was opened in southern Montgomery County in Spring, Texas, on Rayford Road.

H-E-B Plus!
In 2004, the company launched three (in Austin, Corpus Christi, and Waco) H-E-B Plus! stores with an expanded focus on nonfood categories, such as entertainment and other general merchandise. The company added three additional locations in 2005 (Corpus Christi, Round Rock, and San Antonio). The stores offered several new departments, including Do-It-Yourself and Texas Backyard, and greatly expanded product categories in baby, card and party, cosmetics, entertainment, housewares, and toys.

Several other locations were later added, including stores in Flour Bluff, Corpus Christi, Brownsville, Burleson, Bastrop, Beaumont, Belton, Boerne, Katy, Killeen, Cypress, Victoria, Waxahachie, New Braunfels, Kyle, Laredo, Leander, Mission, Rio Grande City, San Juan, San Antonio, Midland, Pearland, Copperas Cove and Hutto.

Mi Tienda
In 2006, H-E-B opened Mi Tienda in south Houston (adjacent to Pasadena) in greater Houston – a  Latino-themed store. Another Mi Tienda opened in north Houston in 2011; it is twice the size of the original location, and has  of space. This second location is off of Little York and Interstate 69/U.S. Route 59. Mi Tienda, which means "my store" in Spanish, sells Mexican baked goods: a tortilleria, where employees make tortillas; and a carniceria providing marinated cuts of chicken, beef and pork. In addition, Mi Tienda also houses the Cocina restaurant, which serves Mexican food and drinks.

Joe V's Smart Shop
In 2010, H-E-B opened Joe V's Smart Shop, a brand featuring discount items modeled after discount grocer Aldi. The first location opened was a  store located in northwest unincorporated Harris County, Texas, near northwest Houston. The store format is smaller compared with a full-service H-E-B store but double the size of an H-E-B Pantry store. A larger, second location with a  space opened in December in northeast unincorporated Harris County, Texas. As of 2016, there were seven Joe V's stores. The "Joe V" name was based on the name of an executive of the company who was involved in the development of this store format.

True Texas BBQ
True Texas BBQ is a barbecue restaurant chain located inside select H‑E‑B stores.

Mexico

H-E-B opened its first Mexican store in 1997 in Monterrey.  It has more than 50 locations in Mexico.  H-E-B crossed the $1 billion annual sales mark in Mexico in 2012.

Litigation
In the mid-1980s, local grocery chains Handy Andy and Centeno joined a lawsuit against H-E-B citing unfair pricing practices. H-E-B eventually settled the suit out of court with Centeno in 1998 for $6.5 million and with Handy Andy for an undisclosed settlement amount.
 
H-E-B has paid $12 million to settle a whistleblower lawsuit accusing the San Antonio-based grocery chain of Medicaid fraud. Since at least 2006, according to the suit, H-E-B allegedly submitted to Texas Medicaid inflated prices on thousands of claims for prescriptions it filled so the company could obtain higher reimbursements than allowed.

Charitable activity
The company gives 5% of annual pretax earnings to causes in the areas in which it operates, including education and food banks. The Excellence in Education Awards are an annual charitable program maintained by H-E-B since 2000, in which teachers, administrators and schools in Texas are recognized, with awards totaling $500,000 in contributions in 2009.

H-E-B coordinated donations to relief efforts in the wake of a fertilizer plant fire and explosion in West, Texas. The company donated $50,000 to the American Red Cross and launched a checkstand campaign benefiting the organization to get the community involved in the relief effort. The company said in a news release 100% of the donations from the campaign will support the American Red Cross's disaster relief efforts. H-E-B also activated its emergency response units, sending the H-E-B Eddie Garcia Mobile Kitchen and water tanker to West, including donations of meals and water to the victims and first responders.

In the aftermath of Hurricane Harvey in 2017, H-E-B donated $100,000 toward relief efforts. Its campaign drive for customer contributions totaled $1,000,000. In addition, H-E-B's Mobile Kitchen and Disaster Relief Units distributed 10,000 hot meals to volunteers and victims in the affected areas in Texas.

After the Robb Elementary School shooting in Uvalde, Texas, on May 24, 2022, in which 19 children and two teachers were killed, H-E-B and the Butt family donated $10 million toward building a new school as founding donors. Initial participants joining the family include Texas architectural firm, Huckabee, and Texas general contractor, Joeris General Contractors.

References

External links

 
 H-E-B at YouTube
 Charles Butt & family profile on Forbes
 Charles Butt on Forbes 2004 List of World's Richest People
 

1905 establishments in Texas
American companies established in 1905
Butt family
Companies based in San Antonio
Privately held companies based in Texas
Retail companies established in 1905
Supermarkets of the United States
Family-owned companies of the United States